Josh Blaylock (born March 29, 1990) is an American actor and professional photographer. Blaylock is best known for his role as BrianD in the web series Video Game High School from 2012 to 2014. He has also appeared in The Bernie Mac Show, No Country for Old Men, and Warehouse 13. Blaylock is also the voice actor of Jack Marston, son of John Marston, in the 2010 video game Red Dead Redemption.

Personal life
Blaylock grew up in Lucas, Texas, before moving to Los Angeles, California, in 2008 to pursue acting. In addition to acting, Blaylock is a photographer. During the production of Video Game High School he was featured in an issue of Allen Image, a community magazine for Collin County, Texas.

In February 2019, Blaylock announced the birth of his son on Instagram. He announced the birth of his second son on Instagram in March 2021.

Filmography
Blaylock's first acting role was for a short in 2004. From there he went to appear in The Bernie Mac Show, No Country for Old Men, Video Game High School, Spider and other series and films.

Video game

Web

Television

Film

References

External links

1990 births
21st-century American male actors
Place of birth missing (living people)
American male child actors
American male film actors
American male television actors
Living people
Male actors from Texas
People from Plano, Texas
People from Collin County, Texas